Svein Stølen  (born 2 March 1960) is a Norwegian chemist.

He was born in Fredrikstad. He graduated as cand.scient. in 1985 and as dr.scient. in 1988, and was appointed professor in chemistry from 1996. His research interests have focused on structure and properties of inorganic compounds. He was elected as the Rector of the University of Oslo for the period 2017 to 2021. He was re-elected as rector for the period 2021 to 2025.

References

1960 births
People from Fredrikstad
Living people
Norwegian chemists
Academic staff of the University of Oslo
Rectors of the University of Oslo